Leifer is a surname. Notable people with the surname include:

 Andrew Michael Leifer, ISEF awardee in 2003, after whom main-belt asteroid 18826 Leifer is named
 Avraham Abba Leifer (1918–1990), a rabbi in Pittsburgh, Pennsylvania
 Carol Leifer (born 1956), an American comedian
 Debbie Leifer, an American magician
 Elmer Leifer (1893–1948), a baseball player for the Chicago White Sox
 Michael Leifer (1933–2001), a British International Relations scholar 
 Mordechai Yissachar Ber Leifer, a rabbi in Pittsburgh, Pennsylvania
 Neil Leifer (born 1942), an American photographer and filmmaker 
 Teddy Leifer (Edward Leifer) film producer and founder of RISE Films
 Yosef Leifer (1891–1966), a rabbi in Pittsburgh, Pennsylvania

See also